Beinn Lair (859 m) is a mountain in the Northwest Highlands, Scotland. It lies in the Letterewe estate on the northeastern shore of Loch Maree in Wester Ross.

The mountain has two contrasting sides. The Loch Maree side is one of gentle slopes to the summit, whereas its northern flank is one of giant cliffs looking straight down into the glen below.

References

Mountains and hills of the Northwest Highlands
Marilyns of Scotland
Corbetts